Emile Faillu (23 April 1903 – 7 November 1974) was a French racing cyclist. He rode in the 1927 Tour de France.

References

1903 births
1974 deaths
French male cyclists
Place of birth missing